The Fluvanna County militia was a component of the Virginia militia during the American Revolutionary War. It was based in Fluvanna County, Virginia for the majority of the war and only saw action near the end of the conflict, in 1781.

Size
It is unknown how many people made up the Fluvanna militia at various points throughout the war. Six companies are listed as the station of Revolutionary War forces in local documents. As of January 13, 1781 Thomas Jefferson knew there to be 260 men enlisted in the militia.  It is known that Thomas Jefferson asked for one quarter of the county's militia, 65 men, to fight at Green Spring, West Virginia in 1781, near the end of the war.

What is known is that Fluvanna was the site of Point of Fork Arsenal, a major center of arms manufacturing for the Virginia government during the Revolution.

Origins
Like other county militias, the Fluvanna militia was formed as a local branch of the Virginia militia. It was led by Captain Richard Napier.

In order to join the militia, men were required to take a "Test Oath" renouncing King George III and pledging themselves to defend the Commonwealth.

Known members
This is a list of known members of the militia and their rank, if appropriate.

Timeline of Events

References

External links
5th Virginia Regiment (pre-1780)
Pictorial Field Book of the Revolution
Bibliography of the Continental Army in Virginia compiled by the United States Army Center of Military History

Fluvanna County, Virginia
Virginia militia
Military units of Virginia in the American Revolution